José Vieira Filho, known as Vieira (born 1 July 1992) is a Brazilian football player who plays for Treze.

Career
He made his professional debut in the Segunda Liga for Penafiel on 8 August 2015 in a game against Leixões.

References

External links

1992 births
Living people
Footballers from São Paulo (state)
Brazilian footballers
Brazilian expatriate footballers
Associação Atlética Internacional (Bebedouro) players
União Agrícola Barbarense Futebol Clube players
F.C. Penafiel players
S.C. Olhanense players
C.D. Cinfães players
América Futebol Clube (Teófilo Otoni) players
Lusitano FCV players
Leça F.C. players
Batatais Futebol Clube players
Esporte Clube Novo Hamburgo players
Esporte Clube São Bernardo players
4 de Julho Esporte Clube players
Treze Futebol Clube players
Liga Portugal 2 players
Association football forwards
Brazilian expatriate sportspeople in Portugal
Expatriate footballers in Portugal